Jessen may refer to:
Jessen (Elster), a municipality on the Black Elster river in Saxony-Anhalt, Germany
 Jessen (surname), including a list of people with the name
Jessen, a typeface created by Rudolf Koch

See also